Al-Rihan also spelled Ar-Rayhan, is a Syrian village located in the Douma District of Rif Dimashq. According to the Syria Central Bureau of Statistics (CBS), Al-Rihan had a population of 4,099 in the 2004 census.

References

Populated places in Douma District